Luo Xi (born 6 December 1960) is the vice president of the Industrial and Commercial Bank of China (ICBC), one of the world's largest banks by assets and market value.

Social Positions
Committee Member of Ministry of Foreign Affairs of the People's Republic of China
Executive Member of Red Cross Society of China
Member of board of CITIC Group
Executive Member of Research Center of Insurance and social security of Peking University
Visiting Professor of Beijing University of International Business and Economics
Office director of China Banking Association--CBA

Published Books
Manual of Modern Bank Accountant
Research of Currency In Rural Area
Practice of Accounting Of Agricultural Bank of China.

Managers of following departments
Department of Financial Risk 
Department of International Business 
Department of Legal Affairs 
Department of Credit Management
Department of Financial Market
Department of Accounting 
Department of Operation Management 
Department of Strategy Management

References

External Reading
https://web.archive.org/web/20130502162013/http://renwu.hexun.com/figure_1195.shtml
https://web.archive.org/web/20130406001115/http://www.fpsbchina.cn/webPage/Information.jsp?menuid=10028

1960 births
Chinese bankers
Living people
Tsinghua University alumni
Agricultural Bank of China people